Martijn Budding (born 31 August 1995) is a Dutch cyclist, who currently rides for UCI Continental team .

Major results

2014
 1st  Time trial, National Under–23 Road Championships
2016
 1st Stage 1 Ronde de l'Oise
 1st Stage 6 Olympia's Tour
2017
 8th Classic Sud-Ardèche
2018
 10th Overall Tour of Belgium
2019
 1st  Overall Tour of Rhodes
1st Stage 2
 Kreiz Breizh Elites
1st Stages 1 (TTT) & 3
 2nd Veenendaal–Veenendaal Classic
 5th Road race, National Road Championships
 6th Ronde van Limburg
 7th Circuit de Wallonie
 7th Druivenkoers Overijse
 10th Grand Prix Pino Cerami
2021
 2nd Omloop van Valkenswaard
 3rd Dorpenomloop Rucphen
 5th Ster van Zwolle
 6th Circuit de Wallonie
 7th Ronde van de Achterhoek
2022
 2nd Ronde van de Achterhoek
 9th Arno Wallaard Memorial

References

External links

1995 births
Living people
Dutch male cyclists
People from Veenendaal
Cyclists from Utrecht (province)
21st-century Dutch people